Kim Kee-hee (or  ; born 13 July 1989) is a South Korean professional footballer who plays as a centre back for Ulsan Hyundai. He can also be fielded as a defensive midfielder. Kim has played for teams in the K-League, Qatar Stars League, Chinese Super League and Major League Soccer. He has also represented South Korea at the national level.

Club career

Daegu
Kim initially played University League at Hongik University from 2008 to 2010. Kim was then drafted in the second round of the 2011 K-League draft by Daegu FC. Kim made his professional debut on 5 March 2011, playing the full 90 minutes of Daegu's opening game of the 2011 K-League season against Gwangju FC, which ended in a 2–3 loss for Daegu FC.

Loan to Al-Sailiya
On 26 September 2012, Kim joined the newly promoted Qatar Stars League club Al-Sailiya on a loan deal.

Jeonbuk Hyundai
Kim joined fellow K-League side Jeonbuk Hyundai Motors in 2013 and would help the team to win two successive K-League titles.

Shanghai Shenhua
On 19 February 2016, Kim moved to Chinese Super League club Shanghai Shenhua from Jeonbuk Hyundai Motors for a reported transfer fee of US$6 million. Kim's agent had described the deal as the "biggest transfer in Korean history". On 5 March 2016, he made his debut for the club in a 1–1 draw against Yanbian Funde.

Seattle Sounders FC
On 27 February 2018, Kim was signed by Seattle Sounders FC of Major League Soccer using targeted allocation money.

Ulsan Hyundai 
On 26 February 2020, Kim was signed by Ulsan Hyundai of K League 1.

International career
In 2011, Kim was selected for the South Korea U-23 national team that participated in the 2012 King's Cup, an annual tournament held in Thailand.

In 2012, Kim won the bronze medal with South Korea U-23 in the 2012 London Olympics, which was the first Olympic medal ever in Korean football history, and he was granted exemption to two years of mandatory military service like the rest of the team.

Honours

Club
Jeonbuk Hyundai Motors
 K League 1 (2): 2014, 2015
Shanghai Greenland Shenhua
 Chinese FA Cup (1): 2017
Seattle Sounders FC
 MLS Cup (1): 2019
Ulsan Hyundai
AFC Champions League: 2020
K League 1: 2022

International
South Korea U-23
 Summer Olympic Games Bronze Medal: 2012
South Korea
 EAFF East Asian Cup: 2015

Individual
 Korea Football Association:  K League Classic Best XI: 2015

Career statistics

References

External links 
 
 
 
 

1989 births
Living people
Association football midfielders
South Korean footballers
South Korean expatriate footballers
South Korea under-23 international footballers
South Korea international footballers
Daegu FC players
Al-Sailiya SC players
Jeonbuk Hyundai Motors players
Shanghai Shenhua F.C. players
Ulsan Hyundai FC players
K League 1 players
Qatar Stars League players
Seattle Sounders FC players
Chinese Super League players
Expatriate footballers in Qatar
South Korean expatriate sportspeople in Qatar
Expatriate footballers in China
Expatriate soccer players in the United States
South Korean expatriate sportspeople in China
Footballers at the 2012 Summer Olympics
Olympic footballers of South Korea
Olympic medalists in football
Olympic bronze medalists for South Korea
Medalists at the 2012 Summer Olympics
Major League Soccer players
Sportspeople from Busan